The Yorkshire Gardens Trust is a cultural heritage charity, founded in 1996, which aims to conserve and promote garden heritage in Yorkshire. It is an independent charity and one of the county garden trusts operating under the Gardens Trust. One of the founders, Valerie Hepworth was awarded the British Empire Medal for services to the Trust in the 2019 Birthday Honours.

See also
London Gardens Trust

References

1996 establishments in England
Organizations established in 1996
Charities based in North Yorkshire